The 2017–18 season was the 72nd season in HNK Rijeka’s history. It was their 27th successive season in the Croatian First Football League, and 44th successive top tier season.

Competitions

Overall

Last updated: 19 May 2018.

HT Prva liga

Classification

Results summary

Results by round

Results by opponent

Source: 2017–18 Croatian First Football League article

UEFA Europa League

Group stage

Matches

HT Prva liga

Source: Croatian Football Federation

Croatian Cup

Source: Croatian Football Federation

UEFA Champions League

Source: uefa.com

UEFA Europa League

Source: uefa.com

Friendlies

Pre-season

On-season (2017)

Mid-season

On-season (2018)

Player seasonal records
Updated 19 May 2018. Competitive matches only.

Goals

Source: Competitive matches

Clean sheets

Source: Competitive matches

Disciplinary record

Source: nk-rijeka.hr

Appearances and goals

Source: nk-rijeka.hr

Suspensions

Penalties

Overview of statistics

Transfers

In

Source: Glasilo Hrvatskog nogometnog saveza

Out

Source: Glasilo Hrvatskog nogometnog saveza

Spending:  €970,000
Income:  €10,950,000
Expenditure:  €9,980,000

Notes

References

2017-18
Croatian football clubs 2017–18 season
2017–18 UEFA Champions League participants seasons
2017–18 UEFA Europa League participants seasons